Lachs (German for "salmon") is a surname. Notable people with the surname include:

 Charles Lachs (1879-1979), Bavarian-Swedish visual artist
 Charlotta Lachs (1867-1920), Bavarian-Swedish singer
 Friedrichs Lachs (1832-1910), Bavarian-Swedish brewmaster
 John Lachs (born 1934), American academic
 Manfred Lachs (1914–1993), Polish diplomat and jurist
 Minna Lachs (1907–1993), Austrian educator and memoirist
 Stephen Lachs (born 1939), American judge

See also 

 Lach (disambiguation)
 Lox, a fillet of brined salmon.

German-language surnames